Hamedanak (also romanized as Hamedānak and Hamadānak; also known as Hamdāng) is a village in Hamedanak Rural District of Bostan District of Baharestan County, Tehran province, Iran. At the 2006 National Census, its population was 9,261 in 2,200 households, when it was in Robat Karim County. The following census in 2011 counted 10,854 people in 2,908 households, by which time the district, together with Golestan District, had been separated from the county and Baharestan County established. The latest census in 2016 showed a population of 11,216 people in 3,222 households.

References 

Baharestan County

Populated places in Tehran Province

Populated places in Baharestan County